Nettenchelys paxtoni is an eel in the family Nettastomatidae (duckbill/witch eels). It was described by Emma Stanislavovna Karmovskaya in 1999. It is a marine, tropical eel which is known from Vanuatu, in the western Pacific Ocean.

The species epithet "paxtoni" was given in honour of John Paxton.

References

Nettastomatidae
Fish described in 1999